Campo dei Fiori di Varese is a mountain located in the northern part of Varese, Lombardy, Italy, It has an elevation of 1,227 metres.

On the Eastern side of the mountain, facing Varese, sits the now-vacant Grand Hotel Campo Dei Fiori. The Art Nouveau-style hotel was designed by Giuseppe Sommaruga and opened in 1910, but subsequently closed in 1968.

Between the end of October and the first week of November 2017, the park was the subject of arson that burned down around 60 acres of woodland.

The Park of Campo dei Fiori di Varese is adjacent to the Cinque Vette Park.

References

External links 
 Official Website

Mountains of the Alps
Mountains of Lombardy